The Sebeș is a left tributary of the river Drăgan in Romania. It discharges into the Drăgan Reservoir.

References

Rivers of Romania
Rivers of Cluj County
Rivers of Bihor County